Christopher Hall is a British sculptor, born in 1942 in Nottingham, England, and now living in Scotland.

He attended Loughborough College of Art, as well as Edinburgh College of Art, where he studied sculpture under Eric Schilsky.

Some of Hall's major public works include:
cloister carvings at Iona Abbey (1967–1997)
gravestone of John Smith, Labour Party leader, Iona (1994)
Eye of the Beholder (sandstone, 1998), Borders General Hospital, Melrose, Scotland
The Dreamer (sandstone, 1998), memorial to Dr Winifred Rushforth at the University of Edinburgh, dedicated by Prince Charles in 2002
Holy Trinity Carving (Doddington sandstone, 2000), Trinity Church, Embleton, Northumberland;
Wildlife of the Tyne (Doddington sandstone, 2002), Tyne Court, Haddington, East Lothian
The Fishers of Fisherrow (Doddington sandstone, 2002), Murdoch Green, Musselburgh, East Lothian
stone boat at the late Ian Hamilton Finlay's garden, Little Sparta, in West Lothian

References

External links
 Official website

Scottish sculptors
Scottish male sculptors
1942 births
Living people
Alumni of Loughborough University
Alumni of the Edinburgh College of Art
Artists from Nottingham